The Kolb Studio is a historic structure situated on the edge of the South Rim of the Grand Canyon in Grand Canyon Village within Grand Canyon National Park in Arizona. It was operated from 1904 until 1976 as the photographic studio of brothers Ellsworth and Emery Kolb.

History 
In 1911, they successfully navigated the Colorado River, filming their journey. Built between from 1904 to 1926, the building which they constructed was both a family home and photographic studio for the pioneering Kolb brothers. The building has evolved through two major additions and countless minor changes during its century of existence at Grand Canyon.  

After the death of Emery Kolb in 1976, the National Park Service acquired the historic studio. During the 1990s, the Grand Canyon Association renovated the building and converted it to its current state. The Grand Canyon Association now operates an art gallery, bookstore and information inside the building.  The bookstore's proceeds go to support the building, and the store features a tribute to the Kolbs’ photographs of mule riders at Grand Canyon. The start of the Bright Angel Trail is to the west of the Kolb Studio.

Restoration project 

During 2013 and 2014, the Grand Canyon Association was in the process of restoring and rehabilitating this significant building. Work includes addressing the structural degradation of Kolb Studio.
 a) rectifying drainage problems from public sidewalks and corresponding retaining walls, 
 b) stabilizing the concrete entranceway to assure safe continuing access to the facility 
 c) repairing and replacing exterior building features (e.g. log and shingle siding, structural beams, gutters, wooden porches) in order to assure long-term structural integrity of the building and 
 d) protecting restored exterior surfaces with paints, sealants and other coatings.

See also 

Buildings and structures in Grand Canyon National Park
National Register of Historic Places listings in Grand Canyon National Park
Rustic architecture in Arizona

References

Other sources
William C Suran  (1991) The Kolb Brothers of Grand Canyon (Gem Guides Book Company)

Related reading
 Ellsworth Leonardson Kolb (2003) The brave ones : the journals and letters of the 1911–1912 expedition down the Green and Colorado Rivers by Ellsworth L. Kolb and Emery C. Kolb  (Flagstaff, AZ: Fretwater Press)

External links 
 Grand Canyon Association.org: Kolb Studio Art Exhibits

Grand Canyon
Art museums and galleries in Arizona
Artists' studios in the United States
History museums in Arizona
Buildings and structures in Grand Canyon National Park
Buildings and structures completed in 1926
1904 establishments in Arizona Territory
Museums in Coconino County, Arizona
Tourist attractions in Coconino County, Arizona
American Craftsman architecture in Arizona
Rustic architecture in Arizona